Fort Canby may refer to:
 Fort Canby (Washington), a coastal fort preserved as part of Cape Disappointment State Park in the U.S. state of Washington
 Fort Canby State Park, the former name for Cape Disappointment State Park
 Fort Canby (Arizona), a fort reestablished at the site of Fort Defiance in Arizona